Sandro Svanidze (born 27 September 1998) is a Georgian rugby union player. He plays as Wing for RC Armazi in Georgia Championship Didi 10.
He was called in Georgia U20 squad for 2018 World Rugby Under 20 Championship.

References

1998 births
Living people
Rugby union players from Georgia (country)
The Black Lion players
Rugby union centres
Rugby union wings